Gerard van Klaveren (born May 7, 1951 in Terneuzen) is a Dutch politician. From 2005 to 2017 he has been mayor of the Dutch municipality of Weststellingwerf, and From 2018 to 2020 he has been acting mayor from the island of Ameland. In 2003 he became Honorary Consul of Iceland.

From 1995-2003 he was member of the Provincial Government of Friesland and delegate for economic affairs, tourism and agriculture. In that capacity, he initiated the Frisian Lakes Project in 1999, an investment of 330 million euros in order to upgrade the quality of the Frisian Lakes and surrounding area. Previously, from 1982 to 1989, he was chairman of the Liberal Group in the municipality Council of Opsterland and from 1988 to 1995 chairman of the Liberal Group in the Provincial Government of Friesland. Originally Van Klaveren was a sworn broker and evaluator of commercial real estate at DTZ Zadelhoff.

In 1997 Van Klaveren took the initiative for the placement of a statue in Grolloo of Harry (Cuby) Muskee, singer of Cuby + Blizzards. Then in 2000 he founded, the Heritage Foundation Muskee, which in 2011 realized the C+B Museum in Grolloo. In 2009 Van Klaveren founded the Liet International Foundation. This foundation organizes an international song festival on a yearly base for songs in European minority languages.

In 1999, the Dutch Minister of Economic Affairs appointed Van Klaveren as chairman of the Steering Committee Certification Agency. The assignment was to the develop a widely supported certification scheme for estate agents and evaluators. The minister felt the need to do so because of the abolition of the then existing title protection system. The relevant certification scheme was established in 2000.

Books and publications 
Published by W.J. Thieme & Cie Publishers, Zutphen:
 1981 De Labrador Retriever
 1982 De Golden Retriever
 1985 De Flat Coated Retriever
 1985 De Frisian Stabij en Wetterhoun
 1986 Het Kooikerhondje
 1989 Jachthonden (Gundogs)

Commissioned by the Association for Stabij and Wetterhounen:
 1987 De Fryske Hounen

References

1951 births
Living people
Dutch non-fiction writers
Honorary consuls
Mayors in Friesland
Members of the Provincial Council of Friesland
Municipal councillors in Friesland
People from Opsterland
People from Terneuzen
People from Weststellingwerf